There are several mountains called Gray Peak:
 Gray Peak (California), Yosemite National Park, California, USA
 Gray Peak (New York), Adirondacks, New York, USA
 Gray Peak (Washington), North Cascades, Washington, USA
 Gray Peak (Wyoming), Gallatin Range, Wyoming, USA
 Gray Peak (Yukon), Big Salmon Range, Yukon, Canada
 Gray Peak (Antarctica), Queen Maud Mountains, Antarctica

Other mountains with similar names:
 Grays Peak (British Columbia), Kokanee Glacier Park, British Columbia, Canada
 Grays Peak, Rocky Mountains, Colorado, USA
 Greys Peak, East Humboldt Range, Nevada, USA
 Grey Peaks National Park, Queensland, Australia
 Grauspitz, the highest peak in Liechtenstein